James Frederick Saunders (born June 13, 1951) is a retired American professional basketball player.

Collegiate career
Fred Saunders began his collegiate career at University of Louisiana at Lafayette in 1970; in his three years there, he averaged 6.5 points per game. Saunders transferred to Syracuse University for his senior year. At Syracuse University, Saunders averaged 9.8 points per game as a power forward for the Orangemen. The Orangemen finished the season with a record of 17-9 and went on to the NCAA Men's Division I Basketball Championship tournament. At Syracuse, he acquired the nickname "Chocolate Thunder" due to his unique skyhook.
Collegiate Stats

NBA
Saunders was drafted in the 2nd round of the 1974 National Basketball Association Draft (31st Overall) by the Phoenix Suns; he played power forward for the Phoenix Suns and the Boston Celtics during the 1970s.
NBA Stats

1951 births
Living people
African-American basketball players
Basketball players from Columbus, Ohio
Boston Celtics players
Detroit Spirits players
Louisiana Ragin' Cajuns men's basketball players
New Orleans Jazz players
Phoenix Suns draft picks
Phoenix Suns players
Power forwards (basketball)
Syracuse Orange men's basketball players
American men's basketball players
21st-century African-American people
20th-century African-American sportspeople